The Chengbihe Dam is an embankment dam on the Chengbihe River, a tributary of the You River. The dam was constructed between 1958 and 1961. The original four generators were commissioned in 1966 at 6.5 MW each but were uprated to 7.5 MW in 1997.

See also

List of major power stations in Guangxi
List of dams and reservoirs in China

References

Dams in China
Hydroelectric power stations in Guangxi
Earth-filled dams
Dams completed in 1961